Isabel Fonseca (born 1961) is an American-Uruguayan writer. She is best known for her books Bury Me Standing: The Gypsies and Their Journey and Attachment. She is married to novelist Martin Amis.

Early life
Isabel Fonseca was born in New York in 1961 and is the youngest of four children born to Uruguayan sculptor Gonzalo Fonseca and American painter Elizabeth Fonseca. Her siblings include Caio Fonseca, a much admired painter whose works hang in the collections of the Metropolitan Museum of Art and Whitney Museum of Art; Bruno Fonseca, a painter who died of AIDS in 1994; and Quina Fonseca, a designer of clothes, costumes, and hats.
Her maternal grandfather was Jacob Kaplan, the former owner of Welch's grape juice.
 
Isabel grew up in a house on West 11th Street in New York that used to belong to Daniel Chester French, the sculptor of the Lincoln Memorial. Both of her parents had studios in this house that the children weren't allowed to enter uninvited. Isabel’s family was connected by, and shared a passion for, creating art. Even her grandparents on both sides were known for creating treasures out of trash. Because of this passion for art, Isabel claims that her parents were around but always preoccupied. They divorced during her teenage years. 

She attended Concord Academy and graduated magna cum laude from Barnard College in 1984. She then went on to study at Wadham College in Oxford.
Isabel Fonseca was very close to her brothers, especially her brother Bruno who died in 1994. Because of this closeness, she never felt the need for serious relationships until her late 20s. After Bruno’s death, she wrote a short collection of stories titled Bruno Fonseca: The Secret Life of Painting that met with mixed reviews among her extended family.

Career 
During her time at Wadham College, she began working as an editor for the Times Literary Supplement where she created a column about cultural commentary that persists to this day. While working there, she also wrote Bury Me Standing: The Gypsies and Their Journey, a history of the Romani people which she researched while traveling alone through Eastern Europe for four years. She traveled with gypsies from Bulgaria, Poland, Czech Republic, Slovakia, the former Yugoslavia, Romania, and Albania. The title comes from a gypsy proverb, “Bury me standing. I’ve been on my knees all my life.” Bury Me Standing was originally published in 1995 by Random House. 

Isabel Fonseca has also written for the Times, The Guardian, The Economist, Harper’s Bazaar, The Wall Street Journal, The New Yorker, and The American Scholar, among other publications. 

In 2006, she took her husband, Martin Amis, and two children, Fernanda and Clio, to Uruguay while she worked on a book about the country's military dictatorship in the 1970s. However, that book was never written and she instead began writing a short story that later turned into the novel Attachment. Attachment was published in 2009 and met mixed reception due to the parallels between the main character Jean Hubbard and Fonseca's affair with Martin Amis in the early 90s.

Marriage to Martin Amis 
Isabel Fonseca met novelist Martin Amis during a phone interview while she was working at the Times Literary Supplement. They began a relationship while Amis was still married to his first wife, Antonia Phillips, an American academic and the mother of his two sons. In 1993, Amis left Phillips for Fonseca, which led to much "finger-wagging" by the British press. The press painted Amis as a second-generation philanderer and Fonseca as a sultry American heiress (because of her being a trustee to the J. M. Kaplan fund). They married in 1996 and had their first daughter, Fernanda in 1997. Their second daughter Clio was born in 1999. 

Similar to the home she grew up in, Fonseca and Amis’s home in London contains an attic studio where she often does her writing. They maintain homes in Brooklyn, London, and Uruguay and spend time living in each of them. From 2006 to 2009, Isabel Fonseca and her family lived in a small Uruguayan village near Punta del Este. While there, they built a house, their children learned Spanish, and Isabel Fonseca penned her first fictional novel, Attachment. Isabel refused to show the novel to her husband Martin until after it was finished. She claimed, “If he hated it, I would have been devastated, and if he really liked it, I probably wouldn’t have believed him.”

Her daughter Fernanda has also been published in The Guardian.

Notable works 
 Bury Me Standing: The Gypsies and Their Journey (1995)
 Attachment (2009)

References

External links
 Interview in The Guardian
 New York Times interview
 Reportaje Diario El País

1961 births
Living people
American people of Uruguayan descent
Amis family
Writers from New York City
Barnard College alumni
Alumni of Wadham College, Oxford
Date of birth missing (living people)